Molière is a 1978 French drama film directed by Ariane Mnouchkine. It was entered into the 1978 Cannes Film Festival.

Plot
Jean-Baptiste Poquelin is raised by his father and his grandfather because  his mother dies when he's still very little. He works as a handyman, studies the law at a university and travels the country as an actor before he becomes the celebrated playwright Molière who impresses firstly the Duke of Orleans and then even King Louis XIV.

Cast
 Philippe Caubère as Molière / The Death
 Frédéric Ladonne as Molière, child
 Jonathan Sutton as La Grange
 Julien Maurel as The friend of Molière
 Philippe Cointepas as The comrades Molière
 Maurice Chevit as The priest of the school
 Odile Cointepas as The mother
 Armand Delcampe as The father
 Jean Dasté as The grandfather
 Joséphine Derenne as Madeleine Béjart
 Brigitte Catillon as Armande Béjart
 Mario Gonzáles as Scaramouche
 Albert Delpy as Nicolas Boileau
 Guy-Claude François as The bird-man
 Michel Hart as Les dévots
 Alfred Simon as Les dévots
 Marie-Françoise Audollent	
 Jean Brard

References

External links
 

Cultural depictions of Molière
1978 films
Italian drama films
1970s French-language films
1970s biographical drama films
Films set in the 17th century
Films directed by Ariane Mnouchkine
French biographical drama films
Biographical films about dramatists and playwrights
1978 drama films
1970s French films
1970s Italian films